The Second Pan-American Korfball Championship was held in Colombia from 2 March 2018 to 4 March 2018, with 6 national teams in competition. The tournament also served as an American qualifier for the 2019 IKF World Korfball Championship, with the top two nations qualifying for the world championship.

Brazil was the defending champion but had to settle for third as Suriname and Dominican Republic took the top two spots and qualified for the 2019 IKF World Korfball Championship.

Results
The six teams played a simple group stage tournament, with the top team crowned Pan-American champions. Suriname secured the title on 3 March with one match to play as they had a three point lead over Brazil and Dominican Republic, two teams which they had already beaten and which still had to play each other in the final match to determine second place.

|}
Key: G denotes win by golden goal.

Final standing

References

2018 in korfball